Marcel Rivet (1905–1957) was a French screenwriter.

Selected filmography
 I Am with You (1943)
 Five Red Tulips (1949)
 Portrait of an Assassin (1949)
 At the Grand Balcony (1949)
 Between Eleven and Midnight (1949)
 The Night Is My Kingdom (1951)
 Operation Magali (1953)
 Three Sailors (1957)

References

Bibliography
 Tim Palmer & Charlie Michael. Directory of World Cinema: France. Intellect Books, 2013.

External links

1905 births
1957 deaths
20th-century French screenwriters
People from Limoges